Richard Chipperfield  (21 September 1904 – 3 March 1988) was an English circus animal trainer and circus owner, of the Chipperfield's Circus dynasty.
Chipperfield was born in Banbury, Oxfordshire, the son of Richard Chipperfield (8 April 1875 – 8 May 1959) and Emily Maud Seaton (16 August 1883 — 9 October 1974).

Chipperfield appeared as a castaway on the BBC Radio programme Desert Island Discs on 3 August 1964.

He died in Banbury, Oxfordshire, England at the aged 83.

Bibliography

References 

1904 births
1988 deaths
Circus owners
People from Banbury